George Augustine Taylor (1 August 1872 – 20 January 1928) was an Australian artist, journalist, and inventor.

Life 
Taylor was born at Sydney in 1872. He began his working life articled to an architect (a Mr Hobbs). However, he first became known as an artist, and was a member of the Sydney Bohemian set in the 1890s, whose doings he was afterwards to record in his Those Were the Days, a volume of reminiscences published in 1918. He contributed drawings to The Bulletin, Worker, Sunday Times, Referee, and London Punch, but later became interested in aviation and radio, and did some remarkable work in connection with them. Taylor was a member of the Dawn and Dusk Club, an association of bohemians and intellectuals that included the writer Henry Lawson. Taylor married Florence Mary Parsons in 1907.

He experimented with a motorless aeroplane (glider) and, in November 1909, constructed one of full size. He also contacted the retired inventor Lawrence Hargrave at this time. On 5 December, at Narrabeen, Sydney, Taylor flew in the glider he had designed and became the first person in Australia to fly in a heavier-than-air craft. Florence Taylor flew in her husband's glider on the same day, followed by Edward Hallstrom. Much gliding had been done in America and Europe many years before this, but the principle and design of Taylor's machine appear to have anticipated the types being used in Europe more than ten years later. In March 1910 Taylor arranged a demonstration of wireless at Heathcote for his superior officers in the army. He enlisted the aid of three civilians to perform this task, Taylor not being an inventor or radio operator himself. Messrs. Kirkby, Hannam and Wilkinson bought their own equipment with them set it up and performed the demonstrations. Taylor always used Kirkby to manufacture wireless sets and demonstrate wireless on other occasions such as at his lecture on the air age and its significance. Hannam went on to be Mawson’s wireless operator on his Antarctic expeditions. Kirkby had built the Shaw wireless works. In 1910 and 1911 he succeeded in communicating from one part of a railway train to another, and in exchanging messages between trains running at full speed. He had founded the aerial league in 1909 and was a co-founder of the Wireless Institute of New South Wales (now the Wireless Institute of Australia and Amateur Radio New South Wales) in 1910.

It was largely on account of his representations that the first government wireless station was erected in Australia. He did some interesting experimental work in connexion with locating sound by wireless, which proved useful in the 1914-18 war when methods of locating submarines had to be devised. Taylor visited Europe in 1922 and studied broadcasting developments. On his return at the end of that year he formed an association for developing wireless in Australia and was elected its president. At a conference of wireless experts called together by the Commonwealth government in May 1923 Taylor was elected chairman, and did valuable work in framing broadcasting regulations for Australia. He was also a pioneer in the transmission of sketches by wireless, both in black and white and in colour.

At around this time he was also appointed to the invention and patents committee of the British Science Guild and was active in the encouragement of scientific innovation and "invention as the one hope of attaining permanent world peace, and a real betterment of the conditions of the human race".

Taylor had for many years before this conducted a successful monthly trade journal called Building, of which he was proprietor and editor. Gradually other magazines were added, including the Construction and Local Government Journal, Australasian Engineer, the Soldier, the Commonwealth Home, and the Radio Journal of Australasia. He also published two volumes of popular verse, Songs for Soldiers (1913), and Just Jingles (1922), and some small volumes of sketches and stories. He was much interested in town-planning, and published in 1914 Town Planning for Australia and in 1918 Town Planning with Common-sense.

An epileptic, he died as the result of a seizure in his bathtub on 20 January 1928 leaving his wife, Florence Mary Taylor; they had no children. The 25 January 1928 issue of the Construction and Local Government Journal contains an article 'The Life and Work of G. A. Taylor', which details the achievements and nature of this remarkable man. In 1929 a gift of £1100 was made to the University of Sydney by the G. A. Taylor memorial committee to found a lectureship in aviation or aeronautical engineering in his memory.

Works
 Taylor, George A., “By Wireless” How we got the signals through, Lieut Army Intelligence Corps
 Taylor, George A., The Air Age and its Military Significance, Lieut Army Intelligence Corps
 Taylor, George A., "Those Were The Days" being Reminiscences of Australian Artists and Writers

Sources
Bright Sparcs
 Accessed 21 October 2012
 Giles, J.M., The Life of George Augustine Taylor

References

External links
 
 

1872 births
1928 deaths
Australian journalists
20th-century Australian inventors